John Francis "Bud" Tomlin was an American football coach.  He served as the head football coach at the University of Arkansas in 1943, compiling a 2–7 record.  Tomlin was born in Washington, D.C. and raised in Muskogee, Oklahoma.  He was hired as freshman coach at Arkansas in the fall of 1942. Tomlin succeeded George Cole as head football coach in 1943 when Cole left to serve in the United States Navy.

Head coaching record

References

Year of birth missing
Year of death missing
Arkansas Razorbacks football coaches
Sportspeople from Muskogee, Oklahoma
Coaches of American football from Washington, D.C.